Secoya may refer to:
Secoya people
Secoya language

See also
 Sequoia (disambiguation)